Ekatarina Nemaškalo (born 31 July 1989) is a Croatian former handball player who played for RK Podravka Koprivnica and the Croatian national team.

Her mother, Olena Nemashkalo, was two times world champion with Soviet union.

References

1989 births
Living people
Croatian female handball players
Croatian people of Ukrainian descent
RK Podravka Koprivnica players
21st-century Croatian women